You Can Count on Me is a 2000 American drama film written and directed by Kenneth Lonergan (in his directorial debut) and starring Laura Linney, Mark Ruffalo, Rory Culkin, and Matthew Broderick. It tells the story of Sammy, a single mother living in a small Catskill Mountains town, and her complicated relationships with family and friends.

The film and its performances received highly positive reviews among critics, and dozens of award nominations and awards at film festivals and during awards season. At the 73rd Academy Awards, the film received a nomination for Best Actress for Linney and a nomination for Best Original Screenplay for Lonergan.

Plot
As children, Sammy and Terry Prescott lose their parents to a car accident.  Years later, Sammy, a single mother and lending officer at a bank, still lives in her childhood home in a village in the Catskill Mountains region of New York, while Terry has drifted around the country, scraping by and getting in and out of trouble.

After months of no communication with his sister, Terry and his girlfriend, Sheila, are desperate for money, so he comes to visit Sammy and her son, Rudy, who are excited about reuniting with him. Despite the disappointment of learning that he cut off contact because he was in jail for three months, Sammy lends him the money, which he mails back to Sheila. After Sheila attempts suicide, he decides to extend his stay with Sammy, which she welcomes.

For a school writing assignment, Rudy imagines his father, who he has no memory of, as a fantastic hero. While Sammy has always given him vague yet negative descriptions of Rudy Sr., Terry is frank with him that Rudy Sr. is not a nice person – though Rudy naively believes his father has changed. Sammy rekindles a sexual relationship with Bob, an old boyfriend, but is surprised when he proposes to her after a short time and says she needs time to consider it.

At the bank, the new manager, Brian, tries to make his mark with unusual demands about computer color schemes and daily timesheets. While co-worker Mabel works well with the changes, Sammy is upset when Brian requests that she make arrangements for someone else to pick up Rudy from the school bus rather than Sammy leaving work at random. After some minor arguments, they start having sex, despite Brian's wife being six months pregnant.

Terry grows close to Rudy during their time together. Yet he pushes the limits of Sammy's parental control, keeping Rudy out very late as the two play pool at a bar. She turns to Ron, her church minister, to counsel Terry about his outlook on life. While Terry resists his sister's advice, he and Rudy grow steadily closer. Realizing her own questionable decisions, Sammy turns down Bob's marriage proposal and breaks off her relationship with Brian.

After a day of fishing, Terry and Rudy decide to visit Rudy Sr. in a trailer park in a nearby town. Confronted by his past, Rudy Sr. denies he is Rudy's father and starts a brawl with Terry. Rudy watches silently as Terry beats Rudy Sr. and gets arrested.

Sammy brings her brother and son home. When Rudy insists that Rudy Sr. is not his father, Sammy finally tells him the truth. Sammy asks Terry to move out, but admits how important he is to her and Rudy, suggesting he get his own place in town and get his life back on track. He scoffs at Sammy's idea and plans to go back to Alaska. While at first it appears the separation will be another heartache, they reconcile before Terry leaves, coming to terms with their respective paths in life.

Cast

 Laura Linney as Sammy
 Mark Ruffalo as Terry
 Matthew Broderick as Brian
 Jon Tenney as Bob
 Rory Culkin as Rudy
 J. Smith-Cameron as Mabel
 Josh Lucas as Rudy Sr. 
 Gaby Hoffmann as Sheila
 Adam LeFevre as Sheriff Darryl
 Amy Ryan as Mrs. Prescott
 Michael Countryman as Mr. Prescott
 Kenneth Lonergan as Ron

While listed in the main opening credits, Amy Ryan and Michael Countryman, playing Sammy and Terry's parents, appear for only a few seconds in the cold opening of the film, caught in the headlights of the truck that kills them.

Production
The story takes place in the Catskill region of south east New York state, in the fictionalized communities of Scottsville and Auburn. The film was primarily shot in and around Margaretville, New York, a village on the border of Catskill Park, in June 1999.

While the bank exteriors were filmed at Margaretville's NBT bank, the interiors were filmed in an unrelated bank closer to New York City, since NBT considered interior filming a security risk.

The scenes where Rudy Jr. walks home in the rain were filmed with the assistance of the Margaretville Fire Department, which used their trucks and hoses to create the rain.

Some outdoor scenes, most notably the fishing trip, were filmed in Phoenicia, New York. The Margaretville cemetery could not be seen from the road, so those scenes were shot at a cemetery  outside the village, on Route 30.

Reception
On Rotten Tomatoes the film holds an approval rating of 95% based on 105 reviews, with an average rating of 8.1/10. The website's critical consensus reads, "You Can Count on Me may look like it belongs on the small screen, but the movie surprises with its simple yet affecting story. Beautifully acted and crafted, the movie will simply draw you in." At Metacritic the film has a weighted average score of 85 out of 100, based on 31 critics, indicating "universal acclaim".

Reviewer Stephen Holden described the film as "the perfectly pitched directorial debut of the playwright (This Is Our Youth) and screenwriter (Analyze This) Kenneth Lonergan. Because it arrives near the end of one of the most dismal film seasons in memory, this melancholy little gem of a movie, which won two major awards at the Sundance Film Festival, qualifies as one of the two or three finest American films released this year....You Can Count on Me is an exquisitely observed slice of upstate New York life that reminds us there are still plenty of American communities where the pace is more human than computer-driven. The movie dares to portray small-town middle-class life in America as somewhat drab and predictable. Without ever condescending to its characters, it trusts that the everyday problems of ordinary people, if portrayed with enough knowledge, empathy and insight, can be as compelling as the most bizarre screaming carnival on The Jerry Springer Show."

David Edelstein called the film the "best American movie of the year", noting that "[w]hat the film is 'about' can't be summed up in a line: Its themes remain just out of reach, its major conflicts sadly unresolved. But Lonergan writes bottomless dialogue. When his people open their mouths, what comes out is never a definitive expression of character: It's an awkward compromise between how they feel and what they're able to say; or how they feel and what they think they should say; or how they feel and what will best conceal how they feel. The common term for this is "subtext," and You Can Count on Me has a subtext so powerful that it reaches out and pulls you under. Even when the surface is tranquil, you know in your guts what's at stake." Edelstein concludes "Lonergan doesn't yet know how to make the camera show us things that his dialogue doesn't, but when you write dialogue like he does, you can take your time to learn. Hell, he can take another 20 movies to learn."

According to Roger Ebert, "Beyond and beneath, that is the rich human story of You Can Count on Me. I love the way Lonergan shows his characters in flow, pressed this way and that by emotional tides and practical considerations. This is not a movie about people solving things. This is a movie about people living day to day with their plans, fears and desires. It's rare to get a good movie about the touchy adult relationship of a sister and brother. Rarer still for the director to be more fascinated by the process than the outcome. This is one of the best movies of the year."

In a 2016 BBC poll, You Can Count on Me was voted by four critics as one of the greatest films since 2000.

Accolades

Home media
The film was released on DVD and VHS on June 26, 2001. It comes with commentary from director–writer Lonergan, cast and crew interviews, plus the theatrical trailer.

Notes

References

External links
 
 

2000 drama films
American drama films
Films set in New York (state)
Films shot in New York (state)
Paramount Vantage films
2000s American films
American independent films
2000 independent films
Sundance Film Festival award winners
Films with screenplays by Kenneth Lonergan
Films directed by Kenneth Lonergan
2000 films
2000s English-language films
Films scored by Lesley Barber
2000 directorial debut films
Films about families
Films about siblings